Dacryodes laxa is a tree in the family Burseraceae. The specific epithet  is from the Latin meaning "loose", referring to the inflorescence.

Description
The grey bark is smooth to scaly. The flowers are white.

Distribution and habitat
Dacryodes laxa grows naturally in Sumatra, Peninsular Malaysia, Singapore and Borneo. Its habitat is mixed dipterocarp forests from sea-level to  altitude.

References

laxa
Trees of Sumatra
Trees of Malaya
Trees of Borneo
Plants described in 1875
Taxa named by Alfred William Bennett
Taxa named by Herman Johannes Lam